Dat P. Tran is an American civil servant who served as the principal deputy assistant secretary for the United States Department of Veterans Affairs' Office of Enterprise Integration and was the acting United States Secretary of Veterans Affairs from January 20 to February 9, 2021.

Early life and education 
Tran was born in Vietnam. His family settled in Ohio and he graduated from Ohio State University with a degree in industrial systems engineering.

Career 
Tran worked for Square D Power Company in Milwaukee, Wisconsin.

He worked for the Senate Veterans Affairs Committee from 1995 to 2001.

On January 20, 2021, following the inauguration of President Joe Biden, Tran was selected to act as interim United States secretary of veterans affairs, pending the confirmation of nominee Denis McDonough by the United States Senate.

References 

American politicians of Vietnamese descent
Living people
Biden administration cabinet members
Year of birth missing (living people)
Place of birth missing (living people)
Ohio State University alumni
United States Department of Veterans Affairs officials
Vietnamese emigrants to the United States